The balsam poplar petiole miner (Ectoedemia canutus) is a moth of the family Nepticulidae. It is found in North America.

The larvae have been recorded on Populus sect. Tacamahaca.

Nepticulidae
Moths of North America
Moths described in 1979